Swan Creek Bridge was a historic Pratt truss bridge located at Forsyth, Taney County, Missouri.  It was built in 1914 by the Canton Bridge Company as one span of a double span highway bridge.  The span was moved to a location at Swan Creek in 1932.  It was destroyed in 1989.

It was listed on the National Register of Historic Places in 1983 and delisted in 1994.

References

Former National Register of Historic Places in Missouri
Historic districts on the National Register of Historic Places in Missouri
Bungalow architecture in Missouri
Buildings and structures in Taney County, Missouri
National Register of Historic Places in Taney County, Missouri